Rodolfo Massi (born 17 September 1965) is an Italian former professional road bicycle racer. He won a stage in 1996 Giro d'Italia and 1998 Tour de France, but was expelled from the 1998 Tour de France after illegal doping was found in his hotel room. In the 1990 Tour de France, Massi was the Lanterne rouge.

Biography
As an amateur, Massi won many races, and when he became a professional cyclist in 1987, much was expected from him. In 1988, he broke a leg, and after the operation, one of his legs was a few centimeters shorter than the other. Massi often complained that he was not able to cycle in a regular way, and became a domestique for many different teams.

In 1998, he had his best year. He won the Tour Méditerranéen and the Giro di Calabria. In the Tour de France, he won a mountain stage, and after the 16th stage was in seventh place in the general classification, and leading the mountains classification, when corticoids were found in his hotel room. He was questioned by the police, and was not able to start the next stage. Massi was the first rider in history to be arrested for breaking doping laws. Later, all legal charges against him were dropped, but the Italian Olympic Committee banned him for six months.

Major results
Source:

1987
 9th Giro di Toscana
1988
 2nd Trofeo Pantalica
 7th Trofeo Laigueglia
1989
 3rd Gran Premio Città di Camaiore
1990
 5th Gran Premio Città di Camaiore
 8th Trofeo Laigueglia
 9th Giro dell'Appennino
1991
 4th Trofeo Laigueglia
1992
 7th Overall Giro del Trentino
1993
 10th Giro di Toscana
1994
 1st  Overall Settimana Internazionale di Coppi e Bartali
1st Stage 1
 5th Overall Tour de Suisse
 8th Overall Tirreno–Adriatico
1995
 3rd Giro del Friuli
 6th GP Industria & Artigianato di Larciano
1996
 1st Stage 10 Giro d'Italia
 2nd Trofeo Laigueglia
 3rd Overall Vuelta a Murcia
 4th Giro dell'Appennino
 6th Overall Tirreno–Adriatico
 6th Overall Giro del Trentino
1st Stage 5 
 8th Trofeo Pantalica
 10th Trofeo Melinda
1997
 1st Tour du Haut Var
 1st Stage 4 Volta a la Comunitat Valenciana
 5th Overall Étoile de Bessèges
 6th Trofeo Laigueglia
 9th Grand Prix d'Ouverture La Marseillaise
 10th Overall Tirreno–Adriatico
 10th Overall Grand Prix du Midi Libre
 10th Overall Tour Méditerranéen
1998
 1st  Overall Tour Méditerranéen
 Tour de France
1st Stage 10
Held  after Stages 10–17
 1st Stage 2 Critérium International
 3rd Liège–Bastogne–Liège
 3rd Paris–Camembert
 4th Tour du Haut Var
 5th Overall Paris–Nice
 6th Overall Tour of the Basque Country
 7th Overall Setmana Catalana de Ciclisme
 10th La Flèche Wallonne
2000
 1st Stage 6 Grand Prix du Midi Libre
 3rd Giro di Campania
 8th Tre Valli Varesine
2001
 8th Giro della Provincia di Siracusa
2002
 7th Gran Premio di Chiasso
 10th Overall Giro Riviera Ligure Ponente

Grand Tour general classification results timeline

See also
 List of doping cases in cycling

References

External links
 
Official Tour de France results for Rodolfo Massi

1965 births
Living people
Italian male cyclists
Italian Tour de France stage winners
Italian Giro d'Italia stage winners
Doping cases in cycling
Sportspeople from the Province of Ancona
Cyclists from Marche